Marie Gillain O.M.W. (born 18 June 1975) is a Belgian actress.

In 1996 Gillain received the Prix Romy Schneider. She is single and has two daughters, Dune (born in 2004, with musician Martin Gamet) and Vega (born in 2009, with French-Italian actor Christopher Degli Esposti).

In popular culture
 She was the heroine of the John Malkovich play Hysteria in Chicago in December 1999.
 She is a model for cosmetics brand Lancôme.
 In 2013 she was nominated for the Magritte Award for Best Actress.

Selected filmography
 Mon père ce héros (1991) - Véronique a.k.a. My Father the Hero
 Un homme à la mer (TV) (1993) - Camille a.k.a. A Man at Sea
 Marie (1994) - Marie
 L'appât (1995) - Nathalie a.k.a. The Bait
 Le affinità elettive (1996) - Ottilia
 An Air So Pure (1997) - Julie d'Espard 
 Le Bossu (1997) - Aurore
 La cena (1998) - Allieva a.k.a. The Dinner
 Harem Suare (1999) - Safiye
 Laissons Lucie faire! (2000) - Lucie
 Barnie et ses petites contrariétés (2001) - Margot a.k.a. Barnie's Minor Annoyances
 Absolument fabuleux (2001) - Safrane a.k.a. Absolutely Fabulous
 Laissez-passer (2002) – Olga a.k.a. Safe Conduct
 Not For, or Against (Quite the Contrary) (2003) – Caty
 Tout le plaisir est pour moi (2004) - Louise a.k.a. The Pleasure Is All Mine
 L'enfer (2005) - Anne a.k.a. Hell
 La voix de Laura (TV) (2005) - Laura
 Black Box (2006)
 Ma vie n'est pas une comédie romantique (2007)
 La clef (2007) - Audrey
 Les Femmes de l'Ombre (2008) - Suzy Desprez
 La très très grande entreprise (2008)
 Magique (2009)
 Coco Before Chanel (2009)
 The Little Prince (2010 TV series) (2010–2013) La Rose
 All Our Desires (2011)
 Landes (2013)
 Valentin Valentin (2015)

External links

 
 
 Marie Gillain at Actrices Francaises Fan Site
 Marie Gillain Online - UK website
 Avenue Marie Gillain - Belgian website
 Le site officieux de Marie Gillain - French website

Belgian film actresses
Belgian television actresses
1975 births
Living people
Walloon people
Actors from Liège
20th-century Belgian actresses
21st-century Belgian actresses